The Horncastle boar's head is an early seventh-century Anglo-Saxon ornament depicting a boar that probably was once part of the crest of a helmet. It was discovered in 2002 by a metal detectorist searching in the town of Horncastle, Lincolnshire. It was reported as found treasure and acquired for £15,000 by the City and County Museum, where it is on permanent display.

Its elongated head is semi-naturalistic, depicting a crouching quadruped on either side of the skull, divided by a mane along the centre. The boar's eyes are formed from garnet, and its eyebrows, skull, mouth, tusks, and snout are gilded. Its head is hollow; in the space underneath, which was filled with soil and plant matter when found, are three rivets that would have attached it to a larger object, probably a helmet. The fragment would probably have formed the crest terminal of one of the "crested helmets" used in Northern Europe during the sixth through eleventh centuries.

The boar's head terminal is one of several representations of the animal on contemporaneous helmets. Boars surmount the Benty Grange and Wollaston helmets, and form the ends of the eyebrows of the Sutton Hoo and perhaps York helmets. These evidence a thousand-years-long tradition in Germanic paganism associating boars with the deities, and protection. The Roman historian Tacitus suggested that the Baltic Aesti wore boar symbols in battle to invoke the protection of a mother goddess, and in the Anglo-Saxon epic Beowulf, the poet writes that boar symbols on helmets kept watch over the warriors wearing them.

Description 

The fragment represents a boar's head. It is hollow, with a shell made of silver, parts of which are gilded, and has garnet eyes. The head is elongated, capped by a prominent mane dividing the skull, and terminates in a blunt snout, defined by three grooved and gilded lines. On each side above the snout are more grooved and gilded lines representing the mouth, which includes pointed tusks. The boar's two small eyes are formed with lentoid cabochon garnets, set in beaded gold filigree work with a double collar. Two gilded eyebrows, cast in relief, are well clear of the eyes and set against the skull. This is also gilded, and repeats on either side the pattern of a crouching quadruped. The figure's head is twisted backwards, its jaws biting across its body and back foot, which, like the front foot, has three toes.

When the fragment was found it was filled with soil and plant roots. Three rivets on the underside—one near the mouth, two at the opposite end—would have served to attach it to a larger object, most likely a helmet.

Discovery 
The fragment was found on 1 May 2002 in Horncastle, a market town in Lincolnshire, England. It was discovered by a Mr D. Turner, who was searching with a metal detector. As required for found objects more than 300 years old and with more than a 10% silver content, it was reported under the Treasure Act 1996, and subsequently declared treasure. Valued at £15,000, it was purchased by the City and County Museum, Lincoln—now known as The Collection.

The acquisition was funded by the Art Fund, the MLA/V&A Purchase Grant Fund, Friends of Lincoln Museum & Art Gallery, and the Lincolnshire County Council Heritage Service Purchase Fund. As of 2019 the fragment is on display at The Collection alongside a variety of Anglo-Saxon grave goods.

Typology 

The boar is of Anglo-Saxon origin, and dates from the first half of the seventh century AD. Although its original purpose cannot be conclusively determined, the style and size of the boar suggests that it formed the terminal of a helmet crest. Figural terminals adorn the crests of many contemporaneous helmets, such as the Sutton Hoo helmet, which has a dragon terminal at either end, and the one from Staffordshire, which features a horse-head terminal. Boar iconography is also found on helmets from the period, typically on the crests, as with the Benty Grange, Wolaston and Guilden Morden examples, or at the ends of the eyebrows, as on those from Sutton Hoo and perhaps York. The Horncastle fragment, with its lentoid eyes, tusks, and defined mane, is stylistically similar to the boar atop the Benty Grange helmet.

Taken in context, the boar would probably have adorned an early model of the "crested helmets" known in Northern Europe in the sixth through eleventh centuries AD. Such helmets are characterised by a rounded cap and usually a prominent nose-to-nape crest, from which the name of the helmet type derives and at one end of which the Horncastle boar was probably once attached.

Notes

References

Bibliography 
  
 
Old English available in the Klaeber text, published as  
 
  
  
 Images on plate XIV
 
 
  
 
  
   
  
  
  
  

2002 archaeological discoveries
2002 in England
7th century in England
7th-century works
Anglo-Saxon archaeology
Boars in heraldry
History of Lincolnshire
Horncastle
Medieval European objects in the British Museum
Medieval helmets
Pigs in art
Collections of The Collection (Lincolnshire)